Zumpango is a region, located in the north of the State of Mexico in the country of the same name. It is also known as the Region XVI Zumpango and has seen major population growth. It has a surface area of 8.305 km² and occupies 12.8% of the state's territory. The seat of Zumpango Region is Zumpango de Ocampo city.

The region is dominated by a dry and moderate sub-humid climates and the reliefs fence with lomerios that part with the Eje Neovolcánico located at a northern pass leading out of the Valley of Mexico and Mezquital Valley , this territory was located inside old Aztec region named the Teotlalpan.

Agricultural production is very important to the region, and ranching and craftwork are also part of its development. This region is named by the people as Zumpangolandia.

History

Archaeology 
In May 2020, discovery of remains of at least sixty mammoths (included male, female, young mammoths) and 15 people were uncovered by the National Institute of Anthropology and History headed by archaeologist Sánchez Nava under the Mexico City Santa-Lucia airport, in the former Lake Xaltocan. According to the INAH, mammoth skeletons revealed in what used to be the shallow part of the lake were better anatomically preserved than those found in the deeper parts of the former lake. Mammoths probably got stuck in the lake and died.

Geography 
The location of the region is in the north of the state of Mexico, and is located in the low extreme geographical coordinates of Greenwich, north latitude 19º50'23" minimum, 19º58'28" maximum, west longitude 99°04'30" minimum, 99°13'35" maximum.

The town of Zumpango de Ocampo, a municipal seat, has governing jurisdiction over the following municipalities: Apaxco, Hueypoxtla, Jaltenco, Nextlalpan, Tequixquiac,Tonanitla and Zumpango. The total region extends 96.37 and borders the regions of Ecatepec Region, Hueypoxtla, Tultitlán Region and the state of Hidalgo.

Hydrography 
The Gran Canal de Desagüe  is an artificial channel that crossing Tequixquiac, was named Xothé river in Otomi language, this channel connect with Tula river and Enthó dam. Other small rivers are Río Salado of Hueypoxtla, Treviño river and La Pila river, which connect with Gran Canal.

The municipal seat is in a small, elongated valley but most of the municipality is on a high mesa which transitions from the Valley of Mexico to the Mezquital Valley.

Region municipalities

Government

Deputation

Subdivition of Zumpango Region 

Santa María Apaxco
Apaxco de Ocampo
Pérez de Galeana
Coyotillos
Casa Blanca
Hueypoxtla
Guadalupe Nopala
San José Bata (Emiliano Zapata)
San Francisco Zacacalco
San Pedro la Gloria
San Marcos Jilotzingo
Santa María Ajoloapan
Tezontlalpan de Zapata
Tianguistongo
Rancho el Carmen
Alborada Jaltenco
San Andrés Jaltenco
Santa Ana Nextlalpan
San Miguel Xaltocán
San Juan Zitlaltepec
Santa Inés
Santa María Tonanitla
Santiago Tequixquiac
Tlapanaloya
Colonia Wenceslao Labra
Zumpango de Ocampo

References

Regions of the State of Mexico